Chah Riseh (also Romanized as Chāh Rīseh and Chāharīseh; also known as Chārsen) is a village in Olya Rural District, in the Central District of Ardestan County, Isfahan Province, Iran. At the 2006 census, its population was 94, in 33 families.

References 

Populated places in Ardestan County